Metallarcha chrysitis is a moth in the family Crambidae. It was described by Turner in 1941. It is found in Australia, where it has been recorded from Western Australia.

References

Moths described in 1941
Spilomelinae